Robert Edward Treuhaft (August 8, 1912 – November 11, 2001) was an American lawyer and the second husband of Jessica Mitford.

Early life
Robert Treuhaft was born on August 8, 1912, in New York City. He was the son of Hungarian Jewish immigrants. He graduated from Harvard University in 1934 and attained his LL.B. degree from Harvard Law School in 1937.

Career
Treuhaft worked for labor union and radical left causes much of his life. From the early-to-mid-1940s to 1958 he and Mitford were members of the Communist Party USA, leaving the party after Khrushchev's revelations about the Stalin era.

Treuhaft was admitted to the California Bar in 1944, and in 1945 he began at the Oakland, California law firm Grossman, Sawyer, & Edises and in 1963 founded his own Oakland-based firm Treuhaft, Walker, and Bernstein, where Hillary Clinton worked as a summer intern in 1971. In 1963, he provided Mitford with background and legal information that was important for Mitford's best-selling exposé of the funeral industry, which he also unofficially co-authored, The American Way of Death.

In 1964, Treuhaft represented more than 700  Free Speech Movement students arrested during a two-day sit-in at the University of California in Berkeley. He and his firm also represented anti-Vietnam War protesters, Black Panther Party, the Student Nonviolent Coordinating Committee (SNCC), the Congress of Racial Equality (CORE).

Before his death Treuhaft specified that any memorial donations be sent to "Send a Piano to Havana" project, which was started by his son Benjamin Treuhaft, whom the State Department had prevented from taking a piano to the embargoed island.

Death
Treuhaft died on November 11, 2001.

References

External links
 Consumers Cooperative of Berkeley Oral History Collection
 Spartacus Educational biography
 
 . (archived from mitford.org)
 Photographs of Robert Treuhaft cdlib.org
 Send a Piana to Havana

American communists
Lawyers from New York City
Lawyers from Oakland, California
Writers from New York City
Writers from Oakland, California
American people of Hungarian descent
1912 births
2001 deaths
American civil rights lawyers
Place of birth missing
American male writers
Harvard Law School alumni